Lavalle is a station on Line C of the Buenos Aires Underground. It is located near the Teatro Colón. The station was opened on 6 February 1936 as part of the extension of the line from Diagonal Norte to Retiro.

Gallery

References

External links

Buenos Aires Underground stations
Railway stations opened in 1936
1936 establishments in Argentina